Kupiansk or Kupyansk is a city in Kharkiv Oblast, Ukraine. It serves as the administrative center of Kupiansk Raion. It is also an important railroad junction for the oblast. Kupiansk hosts the administrative offices of Kupiansk Urban Hromada, one of the hromadas of Ukraine. Population: 
	
Until 18 July 2020, Kupiansk was incorporated as a city of oblast significance and the center of Kupiansk Municipality. The municipality was abolished in July 2020 as part of administrative reforms in Ukraine, which reduced the number of raions in Kharkiv Oblast to seven. The area of Kupiansk Municipality was merged into Kupiansk Raion.

Overview

Kupiansk is located on the bank of the Oskil River. Kupiansk is divided into three subparts, known as: Kupiansk (main part of town), Kupiansk-Vuzlovyi (where the train station is), and Kivsharivka.

Kupiansk is about two and-a-half hours from Kharkiv. The two cities are connected by train and bus.

History

World War II 
Kupiansk was occupied during World War II by Nazi Germany from 24 July 1942 to 3 February 1943.

2022 Russian invasion of Ukraine 

Kupiansk was occupied by Russian forces from 27 February 2022 to 10 September 2022. Although the Ukrainian Army had destroyed a railway bridge to slow the Russian advance three days earlier, Kupiansk Mayor Hennadiy Matsehora, member of the Opposition Platform — For Life party, surrendered the city to the Russian Army in exchange for a cessation of hostilities, as the Russians threatened to take the city by force. As a result, the Ukrainian government indicted Matsehora for treason the next day. On 28 February 2022, Matsehora was arrested by Ukrainian authorities. Later Kupiansk became the de facto seat of Russian-backed Kharkiv military-civilian administration. At Kupiansk town hall the Ukrainian flag continued to be flown for 6 weeks, and at the medical school for 3 months. Locals were forced to work for the occupation force, paint bridges in the colours of the Russian flag and perform railway repair for alleged salaries that were never paid out.
 
On 8 September 2022, a representative of the General Staff of the Armed Forces of Ukraine announced that Ukrainian forces had retaken more than 20 settlements in the Kharkiv Oblast and "in some areas penetrated Russian defence positions up to 50km". On the same day, the Russian occupation authorities claimed that "the Russian army began to defend the city" and that "additional reinforcements entered the region from Russia", indicating that Ukrainian forces were re-approaching the city from the west, after retaking the town of Shevchenkove earlier that day. On 9 September 2022, Ukrainian forces re-entered the outskirts of Kupiansk, starting the Battle of Kupiansk. By the morning of 10 September 2022, Ukrainian forces had recaptured the city council building. Later that day, a Ukrainian official confirmed that the Ukrainian Armed Forces had liberated the city. By September 16, Ukrainian Forces liberated Kupiansk-Vuzlovyi, the sister city of Kupiansk located on the left bank of the Oskil River.
On 3 March 2023 Ukrainian authorities ordered an evacuation of civilians from the city due to advances of Russian Armed Forces around Kupiansk and Bakhmut.

Climate

References

External links

Cities in Kharkiv Oblast
Kupyansky Uyezd
Cities of regional significance in Ukraine
Cities and towns built in the Sloboda Ukraine
Populated places established in 1655